Boaz Evron (June 6, 1927 - September 15, 2018), alternatively transliterated Boas Evron was a left-wing Israeli journalist and critic.

Biography
Evron was born in Jerusalem. He attended Herzliya Hebrew High School and Hebrew University.  Evron's family had lived in Palestine since the early nineteenth century; he is the great-grandson of Yoel Moshe Salomon, one of the founders of Petah Tikva.  He was a member of Lehi and the Canaanite movement early in his life and remains critical of Zionism and supportive of some of Canaanism's tenets.  In 1956 he co-founded the political group Semitic Action.  His writings were published in Semitic Action's journal Etgar and in Tzipor HaNefesh, a paper edited by Amos Kenan and Dahn Ben-Amotz.  He worked for Haaretz from 1956 to 1964 and for Yediot Aharonot from 1964 to 1992.  At Yediot, Evron wrote a column which appeared on the same page as Kenan's; their page in the paper was given the satirical nickname "Fatahland" in reference to their perceived sympathy for the Palestinians.  He also translated books by Bertrand Russell and Edith Nesbit into Hebrew.  Evron was the director of the Beit Zvi theater school from 1970 until 1979. He is on the editorial board of the Palestine-Israel Journal.

Published works

Books
In Hebrew
 מידה של חירות (Midah shel Herut), 1975
 החשבון הלאומי (HaHeshbon Haleumi, A National Reckoning), 1988

In English
Jewish State or Israeli Nation?, Indiana University Press, 1995. (An adaptation of HaHeshbon Haleumi)

References

2018 deaths
Israeli journalists
Herzliya Hebrew Gymnasium alumni
Hebrew University of Jerusalem alumni
Lehi (militant group)
Canaanites (movement)
Haaretz people
Yedioth Ahronoth people
1927 births